Ancora is a 2005 album by operatic pop group Il Divo.

Ancora may also refer to:
"Ancora", an ancient anchor-shaped philological sign found on some Papyri
Ancora, New Jersey, an unincorporated community within Winslow Township, Camden County
Ancora Psychiatric Hospital, in the above community
Ancora String Quartet, based in Madison, Wisconsin
Ancora (Eduardo de Crescenzo album) 1981
"Ancora", song from Ancora (Eduardo de Crescenzo album), covered by Mina, Anna Oxa, Ornella Vanoni
"Ancora", art song by Paolo Tosti
"Ancora", piano composition by Ludovico Einaudi